Sloket Glacier is a glacier flowing north between Slokstallen Mountain and Petrellfjellet in the Muhlig-Hofmann Mountains, Queen Maud Land. Mapped by Norwegian cartographers from surveys and air photos by the Norwegian Antarctic Expedition (1956–60) and named Sloket (the millrace).

Glaciers of Queen Maud Land
Princess Martha Coast